Sergei Fyodorovich Aleinik (born 28 January 1965) is a Belarusian politician who serves as Minister of Foreign Affairs of Belarus.

Early life and education 
Sergei Aleinik was born and raised in Belarus. He studied German and English at the Minsk State Pedagogic Institute of Foreign Languages and the Diplomatic Academy in Vienna. He taught both subjects for years. In the early 1990s, Aleinik enrolled for a post-graduate study in International Relations at The Diplomatic Academy of the Ministry of Foreign Affairs of Austria.

Career 
He began his career as an academic teaching German and English. Following Belarusian independence in the 1990s, Aleinik joined the foreign ministry of Belarus. In 1995, he embarked on his first diplomatic posting at a consul in The Hague and later became the chargé d'affaires in the Netherlands. While in the Netherlands, he was promoted to the rank of ambassador and deployed to the United Nations Office in Geneva with accreditation to the Holy See and the Sovereign Order of Malta. In Malta, he was awarded the Grand Cross pro Merito Melitensi of the Sovereign Order of Malta.

In 2009, he was appointed deputy foreign minister of Belarus in charge of bilateral relations with African, Asian and South American countries with specific task to widen Belarusian diplomatic relations. During his term in office, he established diplomatic relations with Nigeria, Ethiopia, Indonesia and Brazil.

In December 2022, he was appointed Minister of Foreign Affairs of Belarus.

References 

1965 births
Living people
Belarusian diplomats
Ambassadors of Belarus to the United Kingdom
Ambassadors of Belarus to Ireland
Ambassadors of Belarus to the Holy See
Foreign ministers of Belarus
Recipients of the Order pro Merito Melitensi